Buendía or Buendia means "good day" in Spanish and may refer to the following people:

Ángel Buendía Tirado (born 1951), Mexican economist and politician
Ely Buendia (born 1970), Filipino writer and musician
Emi Buendía (born 1996), Argentine footballer
General Juan Buendía, Peruvian military leader at the Battle of San Francisco
Jeremy Buendia (born 1990), American professional bodybuilder 
Juan Buendía (1816–1895), Peruvian military man
Manuel Buendía (1926–1984), Mexican political columnist
Maritza M. Buendía (born 1974), Mexican narrator and essayist 
Miguel Maury Buendía (born 1955), Spanish prelate of the Catholic Church
Nicolas Buendia (1879–1958), Filipino politician
Pablo Buendía (born 1986), Spanish football defender 
Ruth Buendía (born 1977), Peruvian indigenous activist
Ryan Buendia (born c. 1982), American recording artist, DJ, producer, and songwriter
Silvia Buendía (born 1967), Ecuadorian lawyer, TV host, columnist, and feminist activist
Soledad Buendía, Ecuadorian politician

Spanish-language surnames